The 2003–04 Princeton Tigers men's basketball team represented Princeton University in intercollegiate college basketball during the 2003–04 NCAA Division I men's basketball season. The head coach was John Thompson III and the team captains were Ed Persia and Judson Wallace. The team played its home games in the Jadwin Gymnasium on the University campus in Princeton, New Jersey, and was the champion of the Ivy League, which earned them an invitation to the 65-team 2004 NCAA Division I men's basketball tournament where they were seeded fourteenth in the Atlanta Region. Following the season Thompson departed to coach Georgetown where his father John Thompson, Jr. had coached for decades.  He was replaced by Joe Scott. Both Scott and the younger Thompson are former Princeton Tigers basketball captains.

Using the Princeton offense, the team posted a 20–8 overall record and a 13–1 conference record. Nonetheless, the Tigers defeated Penn 76–70 in overtime giving them a nine-game winning streak as they entered the NCAA Division I basketball tournament. In its March 18, 2004 NCAA Division I men's basketball tournament Atlanta Regional first-round game against the Brandon Mouton-led Texas Longhorns at the Pepsi Center in Denver, Colorado the team lost by a 66–49 margin.

The team was led by first team All-Ivy League selections Will Venable and Judson Wallace.

References

Princeton Tigers men's basketball seasons
Princeton
Prince
Prince
Princeton